The Lost Bridge Trail is a  rail trail in Sangamon County, Illinois.  It was built by the Illinois Department of Transportation (IDOT) along an abandoned Baltimore and Ohio Railroad corridor between the east side of Springfield, Illinois to the center of Rochester, Illinois.

The west end of the trail is on the southeast side of Springfield, off the South Dirksen Parkway.  The east end of the trail is in Rochester, at the Community Drive interchange of illinois Route 29.

The trail crosses the South Fork of the Sangamon River near Rochester, and crosses Sugar Creek near Springfield.  Sugar Creek carries the outflow from Lake Springfield, a sizable nearby reservoir.  The Lost Bridge trail name recalls IDOT's failure to prevent salvagors affiliated with the B&O from dismantling the Sugar Creek bridge for scrap.  IDOT had to build a new bridge.    

Population in the trail's Rochester service area is growing rapidly.  Springfield is the county's employment center, and the Lost Bridge Trail is available for use by bicycle commuters who live in Sangamon County's southeast townships.  The trail is managed jointly by the Illinois Department of Transportation and the village of Rochester.

The same railroad right-of-way is also used for a separate trail, the Lincoln Prairie Trail, which connects Taylorville with Pana along the same railroad bed.

The trail has also been extended further into the Springfield city limits via the Bunn to Lost Bridge Trail, which follows small stretches of Ash Street and Taylor Avenue in Springfield. Future plans are calling for this section of trail to extend further still and meet dedicated bike lanes along Stanford Avenue.

References

External links
 Illinois Department of Transportation
 Village of Rochester

Rail trails in Illinois
Protected areas of Sangamon County, Illinois
Baltimore and Ohio Railroad